"The Honeymoon Is Over" is a song by Australian indie rock band The Cruel Sea. The song was released in July 1993 as the second single from the band's third studio album, The Honeymoon Is Over. The song peaked at number 41 on the ARIA Charts.

Inspiration
Perkins later said, "The song is all based around the lines: 'Gonna send you back to wherever the hell it was you came. Then I'm gonna get this tattoo changed to another girl's name'. Before we went into the studio to record, I had met a bloke that had gone through this very dilemma. What to do with the old girlfriend's name written on you after she's not your girlfriend anymore and you now have a new girlfriend who wants HER name there instead?"

Reception
At the ARIA Music Awards of 1994, the song won the ARIA Award for Best Song and Best Single.

"The Honeymoon Is Over" was polled a number 9 in the Triple J Hottest 100, 1993; the highest placing by an Australian artist.

In January 2018, as part of Triple M's "Ozzest 100", the 'most Australian' songs of all time, "The Honeymoon Is Over" was ranked number 96.

Junkee described it as, " rich, laquered oak table of a rock belter that features everything from a scat chorus to a sea of tendrils for a guitar part. It’s pub rock laced with LSD; a panic attack in a dive-bar bathroom. There’s nothing like it."

Track listing
 "The Honeymoon Is Over"	
 "Delivery Man"
 "Blue Dog"	
 "She Still Comes Around"

Charts

References

The Cruel Sea (band) songs
1993 songs
1993 singles
ARIA Award-winning songs